The 2013 WNBA season is the 16th season for the Washington Mystics of the Women's National Basketball Association. The Mystics improved significantly over their 2012 season, and qualified for the playoffs for the first time since 2010.

Although they lost the Conference Semifinals to Atlanta in 3 games, the Mystics won their first playoff game since 2004.

Transactions

WNBA Draft
The following are the Mystics' selections in the 2013 WNBA Draft.

Trades

Personnel changes

Additions

Subtractions

Roster

Depth

Season standings

Schedule

Preseason

|- style="background:#cfc;"
		 | 1 
		 | May 15
		 |  Brazil
		 | 
		 | Hill & Meesseman (12)
		 | Monique Currie (7)
		 | Monique Currie (6)
		 | Verizon Center3509
		 | 1–0
|- style="background:#fcc;"
		 | 2 
		 | May 18
		 | @ Minnesota
		 | 
		 | Kia Vaughn (10)
		 | Vaughn & Hill (7)
		 | Tayler Hill (3)
		 | Bismarck Civic Center1513
		 | 1–1

Regular season

|- style="background:#cfc;"
		 | 1 
		 | May 27
		 | @ Tulsa
		 | 
		 | Ivory Latta (27)
		 | Crystal Langhorne (9)
		 | Currie, Latta, Meesseman, & Ajavon (3)
		 | BOK Center7381
		 | 1–0

|- style="background:#fcc;"
		 | 2 
		 | June 2
		 |  Atlanta
		 | 
		 | Crystal Langhorne (15)
		 | Vaughn & Meesseman (6)
		 | Ivory Latta (7)
		 | Verizon Center8938
		 | 1–1
|- style="background:#cfc;"
		 | 3 
		 | June 7
		 | @ Connecticut
		 | 
		 | Ivory Latta (17)
		 | Ivory Latta (7)
		 | Matee Ajavon (4)
		 | Mohegan Sun Arena6150
		 | 2–1
|- style="background:#cfc;"
		 | 4 
		 | June 8
		 |  Minnesota
		 | 
		 | Ivory Latta (24)
		 | Currie, Langhorne, & Vaughn (6)
		 | Ivory Latta (5)
		 | Verizon Center7870
		 | 3–1
|- style="background:#cfc;"
		 | 5 
		 | June 16
		 |  Indiana
		 | 
		 | Ivory Latta (17)
		 | Currie & Langhorne (9)
		 | Monique Currie (5)
		 | Verizon Center6649
		 | 4–1
|- style="background:#fcc;"
		 | 6 
		 | June 18
		 | @ Seattle
		 | 
		 | Crystal Langhorne (23)
		 | Langhorne & Snow (7)
		 | Ivory Latta (6)
		 | Key Arena4579
		 | 4–2
|- style="background:#fcc;"
		 | 7 
		 | June 21
		 | @ Phoenix
		 | 
		 | Ivory Latta (22)
		 | Monique Currie (8)
		 | Ivory Latta (5)
		 | US Airways Center9636
		 | 4–3
|- style="background:#fcc;"
		 | 8 
		 | June 23
		 | @ Los Angeles
		 | 
		 | Langhorne & Hill (16)
		 | Crystal Langhorne (13)
		 | Langhorne, Latta, Ajavon, & Hill (4)
		 | Staples Center9651
		 | 4–4
|- style="background:#fcc;"
		 | 9 
		 | June 27
		 |  Phoenix
		 | 
		 | Crystal Langhorne (27)
		 | Currie & Latta (6)
		 | Ivory Latta (9)
		 | Verizon Center7950
		 | 4–5
|- style="background:#fcc;"
		 | 10 
		 | June 28
		 | @ Atlanta
		 | 
		 | Monique Currie (20)
		 | Crystal Langhorne (5)
		 | Ruffin-Pratt & McKenith (3)
		 | Philips Arena5512
		 | 4–6
|- style="background:#cfc;"
		 | 11 
		 | June 30
		 |  Tulsa
		 | 
		 | Ivory Latta (15)
		 | Currie, Langhorne, & Snow (8)
		 | Matee Ajavon (3)
		 | Verizon Center6511
		 | 5–6

|- style="background:#cfc;"
		 | 12 
		 | July 6
		 |  Seattle
		 | 
		 | Crystal Langhorne (12)
		 | Michelle Snow (13)
		 | Latta & Ajavon (3)
		 | Verizon Center6174
		 | 6–6
|- style="background:#fcc;"
		 | 13 
		 | July 10
		 | @ Chicago
		 | 
		 | Crystal Langhorne (18)
		 | Crystal Langhorne (8)
		 | Ivory Latta (6)
		 | Allstate Arena14201
		 | 6–7
|- style="background:#cfc;"
		 | 14 
		 | July 12
		 | @ San Antonio
		 | 
		 | Crystal Langhorne (14)
		 | Kia Vaughn (8)
		 | Matee Ajavon (5)
		 | AT&T Center11268
		 | 7–7
|- style="background:#cfc;"
		 | 15 
		 | July 16
		 |  San Antonio
		 | 
		 | Langhorne & Ruffin-Pratt (13)
		 | Crystal Langhorne (9)
		 | Tayler Hill (5)
		 | Verizon Center6843
		 | 8–7
|- style="background:#fcc;"
		 | 16 
		 | July 19
		 | @ Indiana
		 | 
		 | Ivory Latta (16)
		 | Crystal Langhorne (7)
		 | Ivory Latta (3)
		 | Bankers Life Fieldhouse6434
		 | 8–8
|- style="background:#fcc;"
		 | 17 
		 | July 21
		 |  Indiana
		 | 
		 | Monique Currie (15)
		 | Michelle Snow (7)
		 | Ajavon & Hill (2)
		 | Verizon Center6516
		 | 8–9
|- style="background:#cfc;"
		 | 18 
		 | July 24
		 |  Chicago
		 | 
		 | Ivory Latta (18)
		 | Monique Currie (9)
		 | Ivory Latta (13)
		 | Verizon Center14411
		 | 9–9
|- align="center"
|colspan="9" bgcolor="#bbcaff"|All-Star Break
|- style="background:#fcc;"
		 | 19 
		 | July 31
		 |  NY Liberty
		 | 
		 | Matee Ajavon (20)
		 | Kia Vaughn (12)
		 | Emma Meesseman (4)
		 | Verizon Center6711
		 | 9–10

|- style="background:#fcc;"
		 | 20 
		 | August 2
		 | @ Chicago
		 | 
		 | Matee Ajavon (19)
		 | Michelle Snow (6)
		 | Ivory Latta (6)
		 | Allstate Arena5134
		 | 9–11
|- style="background:#fcc;"
		 | 21 
		 | August 4
		 |  Los Angeles
		 | 
		 | Crystal Langhorne (23)
		 | Crystal Langhorne (7)
		 | Ivory Latta (5)
		 | Verizon Center7092
		 | 9–12
|- style="background:#fcc;"
		 | 22 
		 | August 6
		 | @ NY Liberty
		 | 
		 | Crystal Langhorne (24)
		 | Crystal Langhorne (11)
		 | Ivory Latta (4)
		 | Prudential Center8907
		 | 9–13
|- style="background:#cfc;"
		 | 23 
		 | August 8
		 | @ Minnesota
		 | 
		 | Ivory Latta (24)
		 | Michelle Snow (11)
		 | Matee Ajavon (5)
		 | Target Center8723
		 | 10–13
|- style="background:#cfc;"
		 | 24 
		 | August 11
		 |  Connecticut
		 | 
		 | Crystal Langhorne (18)
		 | Langhorne & Snow (9)
		 | Matee Ajavon (8)
		 | Verizon Center7725
		 | 11–13
|- style="background:#cfc;"
		 | 25 
		 | August 16
		 | @ NY Liberty
		 | 
		 | Matee Ajavon (16)
		 | Monique Currie (7)
		 | Latta & Ajavon (7)
		 | Prudential Center6157
		 | 12–13
|- style="background:#fcc;"
		 | 26 
		 | August 18
		 | @ Atlanta
		 | 
		 | Ivory Latta (12)
		 | Crystal Langhorne (9)
		 | Latta & McKenith (3)
		 | Philips Arena4873
		 | 12–14
|- style="background:#fcc;"
		 | 27 
		 | August 20
		 |  Chicago
		 | 
		 | Kia Vaughn (21)
		 | Crystal Langhorne (9)
		 | Ivory Latta (5)
		 | Verizon Center6471
		 | 12–15
|- style="background:#cfc;"
		 | 28 
		 | August 23
		 |  Atlanta
		 | 
		 | Monique Currie (15)
		 | Kia Vaughn (10)
		 | Ivory Latta (4)
		 | Verizon Center7088
		 | 13–15
|- style="background:#cfc;"
		 | 29 
		 | August 28
		 | @ Atlanta
		 | 
		 | Currie, Latta, & Hill (15)
		 | Crystal Langhorne (10)
		 | Ivory Latta (10)
		 | Philips Arena4415
		 | 14–15

|- style="background:#fcc;"
		 | 30 
		 | September 6
		 | @ Connecticut
		 | 
		 | Crystal Langhorne (16)
		 | Crystal Langhorne (11)
		 | Ajavon, Hill, Meesseman, & McKenith (2)
		 | Mohegan Sun Arena5611
		 | 14–16
|- style="background:#fcc;"
		 | 31 
		 | September 8
		 |  Chicago
		 | 
		 | Ivory Latta (18)
		 | Kia Vaughn (8)
		 | Ivory Latta (7)
		 | Verizon Center9060
		 | 14–17
|- style="background:#cfc;"
		 | 32 
		 | September 10
		 | @ Indiana
		 | 
		 | Vaughn & Latta (15)
		 | Crystal Langhorne (10)
		 | Ivory Latta (4)
		 | Bankers Life Fieldhouse8444
		 | 15–17
|- style="background:#cfc;"
		 | 33 
		 | September 13
		 |  Connecticut
		 | 
		 | Ivory Latta (19)
		 | Kia Vaughn (10)
		 | Ivory Latta (5)
		 | Verizon Center7779
		 | 16–17
|- style="background:#cfc;"
		 | 34 
		 | September 15
		 |  NY Liberty
		 | 
		 | Tayler Hill (16)
		 | Kia Vaughn (12)
		 | Emma Meesseman (3)
		 | Verizon Center9454
		 | 17–17

Playoffs

|- style="background:#cfc;"
		 | 1 
		 | September 19
		 | @ Atlanta
		 | 
		 | Ivory Latta (14)
		 | Crystal Langhorne (15)
		 | Ivory Latta (7)
		 | Philips Arena3862
		 | 1–0
|- style="background:#fcc;"
		 | 2 
		 | September 21
		 |  Atlanta
		 | 
		 | Tayler Hill (11)
		 | Vaughn & Snow (6)
		 | Nadirah McKenith (3)
		 | Verizon Center7065
		 | 1–1
|- style="background:#fcc;"
		 | 3 
		 | September 23
		 | @ Atlanta
		 | 
		 | Monique Currie (22)
		 | Crystal Langhorne (6)
		 | Matee Ajavon (5)
		 | Philips Arena4078
		 | 1–2

Statistics

Regular season

Awards and honors

WNBA All-Stars: Crystal Langhorne, Ivory Latta

References

External links

Washington Mystics seasons
Washington
Washington Mystics